Earth Rightful Ruler (sometimes also sold as Earth's Rightful Ruler or Earth Rightful Ruler: Emperor Haile Selassie I) is a reggae studio album by Augustus Pablo, originally released in 1982 on Message Records.

It features vocals from Hugh Mundell, Robbie Shakespeare on bass guitar, and Earl "Chinna" Smith on guitar. Pablo produced the album and played melodica, piano, organ and steel strings.

It was recorded at both Harry J and Channel One Studios in Kingston, Jamaica and mixed at Harry J's.

The title of the album is in reference to Haile Selassie I, the former Emperor of Ethiopia and a messianic figure to Rastafarians.

Track listing

 "Earth Rightful Ruler" (H. Swaby)
 "King Alpha and Queen Omega" (H. Swaby)
 "Jah Love Endureth" (H. Swaby)
 "Rastafari Tradition" (H. Swaby)
 "Zion Hill" (H. Swaby)
 "Java" (H. Swaby)
 "Lightning and Thunder" (H. Swaby)
 "Israel Schoolyard" (H Swaby)
 "City of David" (H Swaby)
 "Musical Changes" (Adapted)

Personnel
 Augustus Pablo - keyboards, melodica, piano, steel strings
 Hugh Mundell - vocals
 Delroy Williams, Hugh Mundell, Norris Reid, Maxie Lynch - backing vocals
 Albert Malawi, Lincoln "Style" Scott, Santa Davis, Horsemouth Wallace - drums
 Lloyd "Jah Bunny" Donaldson, Robbie Shakespeare, Junior Dan, Flabba Holt - bass guitar
 Fazal Prendergast, Earl "Chinna" Smith, Bingy Bunny - guitar
 Sidney Wolf, Ras Menilik Dacosta, Teo Benjamin, Garth Swaby - percussion
 Steele - piano
 Sylvan Morris and Stanley "Barnabas" Bryan - Mixing Engineer

References

External links

Augustus Pablo albums
1982 albums
Cultural depictions of Haile Selassie